The Special Representative of the Secretary-General for Western Sahara (SRSG) is appointed by the Secretary-General to lead the United Nations Mission for the Referendum in Western Sahara (MINURSO).

List of Special Representatives

Controversy
At least two Special Representatives (Johannes Manz and Francesco Bastagli) had resigned from their post in protest against Moroccan political manoeuvres.

See also
 Special Representative of the Secretary-General
 United Nations Mission for the Referendum in Western Sahara

References

External links
 MINURSO 2003 MINURSO posts report

History of Western Sahara
Politics of Western Sahara
United Nations operations in Africa
Western Sahara and the United Nations